Neoduma is a genus of moths in the subfamily Arctiinae. The genus was erected by George Hampson in 1918.

Species
 Neoduma alexeikorshunovi Dubatolov & Bucsek, 2013 Thailand
 Neoduma caprimimoides Rothschild, 1912
 Neoduma cretacea (Hampson, 1914) Formosa
 Neoduma ectozona Hampson, 1918 Philippines (Luzon), Borneo
 Neoduma kuangtungensis (Daniel, 1951) China (Kwantung, Chekiang)
 Neoduma nigra Bucsek, 2012 Malay Peninsula
 Neoduma plagosus Rothschild, 1912
 Neoduma simplex Pagenstecher, 1900
 Neoduma songensis Dubatolov & Bucsek, 2016 northern Vietnam
 Neoduma valvata Kirti, Joshi & Singh, 2014 Assam

References

External links

Lithosiini
Moth genera